The 2011–12 SpVgg Greuther Fürth season started on 15 July against Eintracht Frankfurt in the 2. Bundesliga.

Review and events

Results

Legend

2. Bundesliga

DFB-Pokal

Roster and statistics

Sources

SpVgg Greuther Fürth seasons
Greuther Furth